The women's 66 kg competition in judo at the 1992 Summer Olympics in Barcelona was held on 29 July at the Palau Blaugrana. The gold medal was won by Odalis Revé of Cuba.

Results

Main brackets

Pool A

Pool B

Repechages

Repechage A

Repechage B

Final

Final classification

References

External links
 

W66
Judo at the Summer Olympics Women's Middleweight
Olympics W66
Judo